= Colombo Post =

Sri Lankan English-language newspaper

The Colombo Post is a Sri Lankan English-language weekly newspaper, published every Tuesday.
